The Daughters of Helena (Spanish: Las hijas de Helena) is a 1963 Spanish comedy film directed by Mariano Ozores and starring Isabel Garcés, Antonio Ozores and Laura Valenzuela.

Cast
 Isabel Garcés as Doña Helena
 Antonio Ozores as Alejandro  
 Laura Valenzuela as Mari Paz  
 José Luis López Vázquez as Manolo  
 Manolo Gómez Bur as Leopoldo 
 Soledad Miranda as Mari Po  
 Félix Fernández as Don Fabián  
 Roberto Rey 
 Luis Sánchez Polack as Abelardo López, el poeta  
 Valeriano Andrés as Don Renato Romeo, el jefe  
 Ana María Custodio
 Emilio Laguna as Tito  
 José María Tasso as Fito  
 José Luis Carbonell 
 José Orjas as Invitado a boda fustrada 
 José Santamaría
 Julio Goróstegui 
 José Morales as Colaborador de Alejandro  
 Juan Cortés
 Pedro Beltrán
 Pedro Rodríguez de Quevedo 
 Cecilia Villarreal 
 José Riesgo
 Manuel Guitián
 Antonio Burgos 
 Manuel Aguilera 
 Mike Brendel
 Joaquín Bergía
 Montserrat Laguna
 Manuel Díaz González
 María Mahor as Mari Pepa  
 Mariano Gómez Bur
 Rafaela Aparicio as Esposa del apostador de quinielas

References

Bibliography 
 Virginia Sánchez Rodríguez. La banda sonora musical en el cine español y su empleo en la configuración de tipologías de mujer(1960-1969). Ediciones Universidad de Salamanca, 2014.

External links 
 

1963 films
1963 comedy films
Spanish comedy films
1960s Spanish-language films
Films directed by Mariano Ozores
1960s Spanish films